William J. "Bill" Birnes (born November 7, 1944) is an American author, the incoming auditor for Solebury Township, Pennsylvania, the chairman of the board at Sunrise Community Counseling Center, and ufologist.

Education 
Birnes earned a degree from New York University. In 1974, Birnes earned a Ph.D. in medieval literature from New York University with a dissertation on Piers Plowman. Birnes earned a J.D. degree from Concord Law School, a private online law school.

Career 
Birnes served as a Lily Postdoctoral Research Fellow at the University of Pennsylvania and taught literature and linguistics at Trenton State College.

UFOlogy 
Birnes believes that Earth has been visited by many different types of extraterrestrials, and that pictures taken by NASA have been airbrushed to remove any evidence of alien activity. Birnes speculates that NASA may have taken missions to the Moon after Apollo 17, but these missions were kept secret from the public due to alien interference and new-found extraterrestrial artifacts. Birnes claims that NASA made three additional trips to the Moon; Apollo 18, Apollo 19, and Apollo 20. Additionally, he claims that the Apollo 13 incident was actually an extraterrestrial attack meant to scare humans away from landing on the Moon.

Birnes's credibility was questioned when a UFO sighting over Morris County, New Jersey, on January 5, 2009, was later revealed to be the result of a hoax. The sighting was featured on an episode of UFO Hunters, and Birnes dismissed reports that witnesses saw flares attached to balloons, claiming instead that the movement of lights ruled out the possibility of flares, "a theory "UFO Hunters" has already tested and proven implausible". But on April Fool's Day 2009, two college students, Joe Rudy and Chris Russo, admitted that they had deliberately launched balloons tied to flares near the local airport on January 5 as a "social experiment on how to create your own media event surrounding UFO sightings...to show everyone how unreliable eyewitness accounts are, along with investigators of UFOs."

Media 
As a writer of popular nonfiction, he co-authored The Riverman with detective/academic Robert D. Keppel (1995), an account of serial killer Ted Bundy's involvement in the apprehension of Green River Killer Gary Ridgway. The book was adapted into a made-for-TV film (2004) on A&E. As a UFOlogist, Birnes collaborated with Philip J. Corso, on The Day After Roswell (1998), appeared on the History Channel's television documentary series: UFO Files (2004–2007), Ancient Aliens (2009–2013), NASA's Unexplained Files and I Know What I Saw. He starred in UFO Hunters (2008–2009) as leader of an investigative team of fellow ufologists, and later wrote a book by the same name documenting his experiences on the show. Birnes has repeatedly appeared as a guest on the late night radio talk-show Coast to Coast AM to discuss UFOs. Birnes most recent nonfiction works are Dr. Feelgood with Richard Lertzman, Wounded Minds and Hearts of Darkness with Dr. John Liebert, The Life and Times of Mickey Rooney with Richard Lertzman, Beyond Columbo, The Life and Times of Peter Falk with Richard Lertzman, Edison v. Tesla, The Battle Over Their Last Invention with Joel Martin, Psychiatric Criminology with Dr. John Liebert, and UFO Hunters Book 2. Birnes will be appearing again in the third season of NASA's Unexplained Files and in early 2016 on Reelz TV's Dr. Feelgood.

Bibliography
 The Day After Roswell (1998) with Philip J. Corso 
 Star Trek Cookbook (1999) with Ethan Phillips
 Unsolved UFO Mysteries (2000) with Harold Burt
 The UFO Magazine UFO Encyclopedia (2004)
 Space Wars: The First Six Hours of World War III (2007) with William B. Scott, Michael J. Coumatos 
 Worker in the Light: Unlock Your Five Senses And Liberate Your Limitless Potential (2008) with George Noory
 Serial Violence: Analysis of Modus Operandi and Signature Characteristics of Killers (2008) with Robert D. Keppel
 The Haunting of America: From the Salem Witch Trials to Harry Houdini (2009) with Joel Martin & George Noory
 Journey to the Light: Find Your Spiritual Self and Enter Into a World of Infinite Opportunity (2009) with George Noory
 Counterspace: The Next Hours of World War III (2009) with William B. Scott & Michael J. Coumatos
 UFO Hunters (2009)
 George Noory's Late-Night Snacks: Winning Recipes for Late-Night Radio Listening (2013) with George Noory
 The Haunting of Twenty-First-Century America (2013) with Joel Martin

References

External links

American UFO writers
New York University alumni
1944 births
Living people
Ufologists
American male novelists
Concord University alumni
University of Pennsylvania fellows
The College of New Jersey faculty
21st-century American novelists
20th-century American male writers
21st-century American male writers
Novelists from New Jersey
20th-century American non-fiction writers
21st-century American non-fiction writers
American male non-fiction writers